John S. H. Rosewell (1 July 1882 – 20 November 1931) was an Australian rugby union and pioneer professional rugby league footballer and represented his country at both sports – a dual-code international.

Rugby union career
His rugby union career was played with the South Sydney RUFC. Rosewell was 28 years of age before he first saw representative success making four appearances in 1907 against the All Blacks, two for New South Wales  and two as a Wallaby.

Rugby league career
He joined the new rugby league code in its first year – 1908, starting with the South Sydney Rabbitohs. Along with Dally Messenger, Denis Lutge, Doug McLean snr and Micky Dore he was one of the inaugural five Australian dual code rugby internationals who having earlier represented at rugby union, debuted in international rugby league in Sydney on 9 May 1908 in the first ever Australian league Test against New Zealand. He is listed on the Australian Players Register as Kangaroo No.13.

He spent three seasons at South Sydney playing 29 matches scoring 4 tries and 6 goals. He was a member of the 1910 Rabbitohs side that drew the Grand Final against Newtown but lost the premiership on countback.

He was selected on the pioneer 1908 Kangaroo tour of Great Britain and played one tour match. For the 1911 and 1912 seasons he saw out his playing career with the Annandale club

In 1913 he was the first grade coach of the Rabbitohs.

Death
After his retirement from football, Johnny Rosewell worked at the RAS Showground until his death. He died suddenly at his Maroubra home on 20 November 1931, and was buried the following day at Botany Cemetery.

Sources
 Whiticker, Alan (2004) Captaining the Kangaroos, New Holland, Sydney
 Andrews, Malcolm (2006) The ABC of Rugby League, Austn Broadcasting Corpn, Sydney

References

                   

1882 births
1938 deaths
Annandale rugby league players
Australia international rugby union players
Australia national rugby league team players
Australian rugby league coaches
Australian rugby league players
Australian rugby union players
Burials at Eastern Suburbs Memorial Park
Dual-code rugby internationals
New South Wales rugby league team players
Rugby league players from Sydney
South Sydney Rabbitohs coaches
South Sydney Rabbitohs players
Rugby union players from Sydney
Rugby union props
South Sydney Rabbitohs captains